The pygmy limbless skink (Melanoseps pygmaeus) is an extant species of skink, a lizard in the family Scincidae. The species is found in  Tanzania.

References

Melanoseps
Reptiles described in 2006
Reptiles of Tanzania
Endemic fauna of Tanzania
Taxa named by Donald George Broadley